Masenko may refer to:

 Masenqo, a single-stringed bowed lute commonly found in the musical traditions of Ethiopia and Eritrea
 Masenko, a fictional offensive technique used by Piccolo, Gohan, Trunks, and Pan in the Dragon Ball franchise